María Emilia Salerni (born 14 May 1983), known as "Pitu Salerni", is a former professional tennis player from Argentina.

On 25 February 2008, she reached her best singles ranking of world No. 65. On 23 September 2002, she peaked at No. 45 in the doubles rankings.

The two-time former junior Grand Slam champion, winning Wimbledon and US Open in 2000, as well as finishing runner-up at Roland Garros, was named the 2000 ITF Junior World Champion. Salerni dated Argentine tennis player Guillermo Cañas until 2007.

Salerni retired from professional tennis in 2009 after a string of injuries.

WTA career finals

Singles: 1 (runner-up)

Doubles: 6 (2 titles, 4 runner-ups)

ITF finals

Singles: 16 (12–4)

Doubles: 18 (9–9)

Sources
 María Emilia Salerni at CBS SportsLine. 
  Official website.
  RedArgentina, Deportes.

References

External links
 
 
 

1983 births
Living people
Argentine female tennis players
Argentine people of Italian descent
People from Rafaela
US Open (tennis) junior champions
Wimbledon junior champions
Tennis players at the 2000 Summer Olympics
Grand Slam (tennis) champions in girls' singles
Grand Slam (tennis) champions in girls' doubles
Olympic tennis players of Argentina
Sportspeople from Santa Fe Province